Sanderson High School is a public high school located in Sanderson, Texas (USA). It is part of the Terrell County Independent School District which serves all students in Terrell County and classified as a 1A school by the UIL. In 2015, the school was rated "Met Standard" by the Texas Education Agency.

Athletics
The Sanderson Eagles compete in the following sports: - 

Basketball
Cross Country
6-Man Football
Tennis
Track and Field

State Finalists
Football 
2002(6M)

See also
List of Six-man football stadiums in Texas

References

External links
Terrell County ISD

Public high schools in Texas
Education in Terrell County, Texas